Dobele is a town in the cultural region Zemgale in Latvia, and is located near the center of Latvia on the banks of the river Bērze. It received town rights in 1917 whilst being a part of the German occupied Courland Governorate during the First World War. As of 2020, the population was 8,856.

Name origin
In a German document from 1254 a place name Dubelene or Dubelone has been used. Later the names Doblene, Doblenen and Doblen also have been used for this inhabited location. The original place name can be reconstructed as Dobelene or Dobeliene, but its origins are linked to the place name duobe (pit or delve) and duobele (dip, dimple). Most likely, the reconstructed place name Dobelene meant 'populated area in a dimple'.

History
Dobele is first mentioned in historical sources in 1254; however, at that time it was only a wooden fortress which was destroyed during the Semigallian War of Independence (1279–1290), the final phase of the Northern Crusades in Latvia. On its spot, a new stone castle was erected in 1335 and a small settlement grew up around it. The ruins of this fortress are still visible and are in the process of being restored. The original church was constructed in 1495, and eventually, the fortress developed into a trading post. In the 17th century, a watermill, sawmill, a cardigan mill, and a vinegar-works were constructed during the reign of duke Jacob Kettler. In 1927, the Jelgava–Liepāja Railway connected the city to other important towns and a period of development resulted.

Industry
Dobele is the home of many large enterprises, such as mills, the "Spodrība" chemical plant, and the "Baltic Candles" candle factory.

Education
In Dobele, as in other Latvian towns, there are several educational establishments: five comprehensive schools, including the Dobele State Grammar School, four kindergartens, Music and Art schools, a Vocational school and Adult Education Center, as well as Children and Youth Centres.

Culture
The town of Dobele has a Cultural Centre as well as a museum. The town is also the location of 8 nationally protected monuments, such as the old castle, church, and town hall.

There are several annual festivals and holidays celebrated including the Ielīgosim Jāņus, the Midsummer celebration, and the jubileja, or festival, which changes yearly.

Demographics
Latvians make up 75.5% of the population while Russians, at 14%, are a significant minority. Other groups include Belarusians - 3.3%, Lithuanians - 2.3%, Ukrainians -1.8%, Poles - 1.5%, and 1.6% are of other nationalities.

Notable people
Alexei Kudrin, Minister of Finances of Russia
Andris Naudužs, racing cyclist
Lauris Reiniks, musician
Gunārs Saliņš, modernist poet
Viktors Ščerbatihs, weightlifter, Olympic silver-medalist
Ritvars Suharevs, weightlifter
Kristers Tobers, Football player, Latvia National football team, Lechia Gdansk

See also
List of cities in Latvia
Dobele crater

References

 
Dobele Municipality
Towns in Latvia
1917 establishments in Latvia
Populated places established in 1917
Doblen County